Govindasamy Saravanan (born 12 May 1970) is a Malaysian male race walker. He won the gold medal at the 1998 Commonwealth Games staged in his home country.

International competitions

References

1970 births
Living people
Malaysian male racewalkers
Commonwealth Games gold medallists for Malaysia
Commonwealth Games medallists in athletics
Athletes (track and field) at the 1998 Commonwealth Games
Asian Games competitors for Malaysia
Athletes (track and field) at the 1998 Asian Games
Malaysian people of Indian descent
Southeast Asian Games medalists in athletics
Southeast Asian Games gold medalists for Malaysia
Competitors at the 2001 Southeast Asian Games
Medallists at the 1998 Commonwealth Games